This is the list of Panamerican junior records in Olympic weightlifting. They are the best results set in competition by athletes aged 20 or younger throughout the entire calendar year of the performance. Records are maintained in each weight class for the snatch, clean and jerk, and the total for both by the Pan American Weightlifting Federation (PAWF).

Men
Key to tables:

Women

References
General
 Pan American Junior records 
Specific

External links
 PAWF website

Panamerican, junior
Weightlifting in North America
Weightlifting in South America
Weightlifting junior